is a yōkai in Japanese mythology.
The Kotobuki is a Japanese Chimera that has the parts of the creatures of the animals on the Chinese zodiac where it sports the head of a rat, the ears of a rabbit, the horns of an ox, the comb of a rooster, the beard of a goat, the neck of a dragon, the mane of a horse, the shoulders of a tiger, the arms of a monkey, the back of a boar, the hind legs of a dog, and the tail of a snake.

See also
 Nue, a related Japanese Chimera

References

External links
 Kotobuki at Yokai.com

Yōkai
Mythological hybrids